Hot Issue (stylized in all caps) was a South Korean girl group formed by S2 Entertainment in 2021. The group consisted of seven members: Mayna, Nahyun, Hyeongshin, Dana, Yewon, Yebin, and Dain. The group debuted on April 28, 2021, with their first extended play (EP), Issue Maker. The group officially disbanded on April 22, 2022.

Name 
The group name "Hot Issue" stands for Honest, Outstanding, and Terrific, and expresses a strong ambition to create honest and great issues in the music industry.

History

Pre-debut 
Before they debuted, Dana was a former child actress, starring in the JTBC drama Happy Ending in 2012 and in the SBS drama One Well-Raised Daughter in 2013. Mayna was a contestant on the Chinese survival show, Produce 101 China, but was eliminated in episode 7 after being ranked 52.

2021–2022: Debut and disbandment 
On April 8, 2021, S2 Entertainment announced through social media networks that Hot Issue would debut on April 28, with "Gratata" being revealed as the lead single of Issue Maker on April 12. On April 28, at 6 PM KST, their first EP, Issue Maker, was released along with the music video for "Gratata", with a debut showcase being held at Yes24 Live Hall in Seoul several hours before they debuted. The next day, the group made their music show debut on Episode 707 of M! Countdown on April 29.

On September 2, S2 Entertainment announced that Hot Issue would be making a comeback in September.  They released their first single album Icons on September 29, with the lead single of the same name.

On April 22, 2022,  after 4 months of no updates, S2 Entertainment announced that the group has officially disbanded, 6 days before their debut anniversary.  The decision was made after a long period of discussion about their future and direction of the group.

Members 
Adapted from their Naver Profile
Mayna
 Nahyun - Leader
 Hyeongshin
 Dana
 Yewon
 Yebin
 Dain

Discography

Extended plays

Single albums

Singles

Videography

Music video

Awards and nominations

Notes

References

External links 

2021 establishments in South Korea
Musical groups established in 2021
Musical groups from Seoul
K-pop music groups
South Korean girl groups
South Korean dance music groups
Musical groups disestablished in 2022
2022 disestablishments in South Korea